Jamil Sidqi al-Zahawi (17 June 1863 – January 1936) was a prominent Iraqi poet and philosopher. He is regarded as one of the greatest contemporary poets of the Arab world and was known for his defence of women's rights.

Biography

Jamil Sidqi al-Zahawi  was born on 18 June 1863 in Baghdad. He descended from a prominent family of  Kurdish origin, His father was the Mufti of Iraq and a member of the scholarly Baban clan. His parents separated soon after the children were born and the children's mother returned to her family, taking her children with her. His father, who was partial to Jamil's intelligence and quick temper, decided to raise the boy himself. His father taught him poetry from a very young age and encouraged him to develop an inquisitive mind.

He was raised in Baghdad, where he was initially educated in kuttab (Qur'anic school). He did not receive a formal education; instead his father engaged private tutors to teach him science, rhetoric and grammar. He may have gained some formal education in jurisprudence, logic, astronomy and exegesis, although details are sketchy. However, it is clear that he was mostly self-taught, using books, especially translations of European works on science and philosophy. Through his father, he participated in Baghdad's literary society by attending majalis (social gatherings of the literary elite) for discussions of various topics. The informal nature of his education combined with his early exposure to debating societies, contributed to his love of debate and his inquisitive attitude.

In 1896, he was invited to Istanbul. Between 1896 and 1898, he based himself in Istanbul but also travelled to Yemen on an Imperial decree, as part of a delegation to carry out reforms. In Istanbul, he was appointed Professor of Islamic Studies at the Malakki School and Professor of Arabic Literature at the University of Istanbul.  During this period, he came into contact with the Turkish literary society and was exposed to those Turkish poets who were experimenting with modern poetry and seeking to liberate their work from the constraints of meter and rhyme. He also had the opportunity to read Arabic translations of works by Shakespeare and Western poetry. These encounters exposed him to new ideas about modern poetry and its role in political debate, and would subsequently inform his work in terms of both its form and the choice of subject matter.

He returned to Baghdad briefly, but he was exiled for his outspoken views, by the despotic Hamidi regime and forced to return to Istanbul in around 1908. In Istanbul, he worked for the Committee of Union and Progress (CUP), also known as the Young Turks, where he met with prominent members of the Union movement. He became highly politicised by the relationships formed at this time and remained committed to social reform throughout his life. To this end, he regularly contributed regular articles to various publications in Iraq and in Istanbul.

Following his return to Baghdad, he held numerous government positions: as a member of the Baghdad Education Council, where he championed education for women and as an editor of the only newspaper in Baghdad, al-Zawra. He was appointed a Professor of law at Baghdad University, but his tenure was short-lived. A controversial article on women's emancipation which exhorted women to give up the veil and called for reforms to the existing divorce laws, caused a public outcry, resulting in his home being mobbed for an entire week. In order to appease the public, al-Zahawi was dismissed from his academic position in 1910. Following this incident, he fled Iraq and resided first in Egypt and later in Turkey.

His final return to Baghdad was after the British Mandate was formed in 1920. After Iraq's independence in 1921, he was elected to parliament twice and appointed to the upper chamber (1925–29). In his spare time, he could be found in Baghdad's cultural cafés, where he actively participated in arguments with poets and literary figures.

During his career, he was a critic of the Wahhabis, the extremist group that was the foundation of the Saudi kingdom, and which subsequently morphed into Al Qaeda and Islamic State. He described their atrocities and denounced their claims that only they were the true Muslims. He was also a champion of women's rights, criticising the wearing of the veil, the practice of older men marrying adolescent girls, forced marriage without previous acquaintance, polygamy and male privileges. 

He was one of the leading writers in the Arab world, publishing in the major newspapers and journals of Beirut, Cairo, and Baghdad. Describing his life in a collection of his poems, he wrote, "In my childhood I was thought of as eccentric because of my unusual gestures; in my youth, as feckless because of my ebullient nature, lack of seriousness, and excessive playfulness; in my middle age as courageous for my resistance to tyranny; and in my old age as an apostate because I propounded my philosophical views."

He clung to his principles of simplicity in poetry and the avoidance of the artifice and false conceits that had preoccupied traditional poets. He also stressed the importance of poetry as a vehicle for social commentary. However, his work attracted literary criticism in the period following the first World War, when a wave of nationalism began to influence the arts. By this time, his forthright language and prose-like verse began to look unsophisticated and outdated. Moreover, his use of blank verse, which had always been experimental, began to look naive and clumsy. Although he lost favour with critics, he remained popular with the people because of his gifts as an orator and the accessibility of his writing. Towards the end of his life, he was largely ostracised by the new literary elite.  In the 1930s, because of his political views, he was also marginalized by the political establishment. He was embittered by the way he was treated and cast himself as the "misunderstood poet/philosopher with a perpetually wounded ego."

Work

Al-Zahawi wrote poetry in Arabic, Persian, Turkish and Kurdish. Some of his works, such as The True Dawn in Refuting Those Who Deny the Seeking of Intercession and the Miracles of Saints (1905) have been translated into English, but he himself never learned any European language. Egyptian writer Taha Hussein said of him: "Zahawi wasn't only the poet of Arabic language or the poet of Iraq, he was also the poet of Egypt and of other countries... he was a poet of the mind... the Ma'arri of this era... but he is the Ma'arri who connected to Europe and used knowledge as a weapon."

The English writer, Gertrude Bell was present at a dinner in 1921, when al-Zahawi read an ode to Faisal ibn Hussein. Bell writes:

He was the first Kurdish poet to introduce sh'ir musal (blank verse; free of rhyme, no adherence to rhyme or composed of different rhyme) and was an enthusiastic proponent of the form arguing that it liberated poets to focus on expressing their ideas rather than being locked into searching for a rhyming word or phrase. His philosophy and style made him one of the early modern poets in the Arab world and he was lauded as such during the Ottoman era.

He also published a number of works on the subject of astronomy including: The Universe, Gravitation and its Explanation, General Repulsion and Natural and Astronomical Phenomena, which expounded theories which were ultimately shown to be fundamentally flawed.

Selected works

Al-Zahawi's most celebrated works include:
 Equality in Age poem translated from Arabic to English by Sivar Qazaz- a condemnation of the marriage of older Muslim men to young women
 The True Dawn in Refuting Those Who Deny the Seeking of Intercession and the Miracles of Saints, 1905 - book, collection of poems and writings
 Al-Kalim al-Manzum [Poetic Utterances, in Arabic] anthology, originally published in Beirut in 1909, and republished by Leopold Classic Library  as a classic edition in 2016
 Rubaiyyat al-Zahawi [Zahawi's Quatrains, in Arabic], anthology, 1924
 Diwan [Collected works], anthology, 1924
 Al-Lubab [The Essence, in Arabic], 1928
 Thawra fil Jahim [Revolt in Hell], long poem, 1931 and subsequently included in the collection of poetry, Aushal, published in 1934
 Aushal [Trickles, in Arabic], 1934
 Al Thumala [Last Drops, in Arabic], 1939 (edited by his wife and published posthumously)

See also

 Iraqi art
 Islamic poetry
 List of Iraqi artists

References

Further reading
 Al-Rashudi, Abd al-Hamid, al-Zahawi: Dirasat wa-Nusus [al-Zahawi: Studies and Texts], Beirut, Matbaʿat al-Hayat, 1966
 Sami Zubaida, "Iraqi Memoirs of Ottomans and Arabs: Maʿruf al-Rusafi and Jamil Sidqi al-Zahawi," in: Ozdalga, Elisabeth, Ozervarli, Sait, and Tansug, Feryal (eds), Istanbul as Seen from a Distance,  Istanbul, Swedish Research Institute, 2011, pp 193–202

1863 births
1936 deaths
Arabs from the Ottoman Empire
Iraqi Muslims
20th-century Iraqi poets
Muslim poets
19th-century writers in Ottoman Iraq
Writers from Baghdad
Iraqi women's rights activists
Iraqi philosophers
Male feminists
Iraqi feminists
Proponents of Islamic feminism
Iraqi Kurdish people
Iraqi Turkmen people
Iraqi Kurdish feminists
Feminist philosophers
19th-century poets of Ottoman Iraq
20th-century Iraqi writers
Members of Iraqi Academy of Sciences